A standby generator is a back-up electrical system that operates automatically. Within seconds of a utility outage an automatic transfer switch senses the power loss, commands the generator to start and then transfers the electrical load to the generator. The standby generator begins supplying power to the circuits. After utility power returns, the automatic transfer switch transfers the electrical load back to the utility and signals the standby generator to shut off.  It then returns to standby mode where it awaits the next outage. To ensure a proper response to an outage, a standby generator runs weekly self-tests. Most units run on diesel, natural gas, or liquid propane gas.

Automatic standby generator systems may be required by building codes for critical safety systems such as elevators in high-rise buildings, fire protection systems, standby lighting, or medical and life support equipment. Residential standby generators are increasingly common, providing backup electrical power to HVAC systems, security systems, and household appliances such as refrigerators, stoves, and water heaters.

See also
 Diesel generator
 Electric generator
 Emergency power system
 Uninterruptible power supply

References

External links 
 Popular Mechanics:  How to Buy the Right Backup Generator for Your Disaster & Budget
  Reliable Power: The Differences in Generators

Power station technology